David Allan (15 April 1956 – 6 June 1989) was an Australian racing cyclist. He finished in second place in the Australian National Road Race Championships in 1979. He was the first and fastest in the Melbourne to Warrnambool Classic on three occasions, in 1976, 1979 and 1982.

References

External links
 

1956 births
1989 deaths
Australian male cyclists
Cyclists from Melbourne